Rubén Alfonso Fernández Aceves (born 5 March 1967) is a Mexican lawyer and politician affiliated with the National Action Party from 1986 to 2002. Deputy of the LVII Legislature.

References

1967 births
Living people
Politicians from Mexico City
20th-century Mexican lawyers
Members of the Senate of the Republic (Mexico)
Members of the Chamber of Deputies (Mexico)
National Action Party (Mexico) politicians
Autonomous University of Baja California alumni
20th-century Mexican politicians
21st-century Mexican politicians
21st-century Mexican lawyers